Diego Sosa may refer to:

 Diego Sosa (footballer, born 1980), Argentine defender for Club Social y Deportivo Flandria
 Diego Sosa (footballer, born 1991), Argentine midfielder for Godoy Cruz Antonio Tomba
 Diego Sosa (footballer, born 1997), Argentine defender for Club Atlético Tigre